"Je te donne" is a bilingual pop song, recorded in English and French. It was performed by Jean-Jacques Goldman and Michael Jones and was released as a single in late 1985. It reached number-one for eight weeks on the French Singles Chart, becoming one of the best-selling singles of the 1980s in France. The song has been covered by Worlds Apart in 1996 and Ivyrise in 2013 and achieved success in many countries where it charted.

Jean-Jacques Goldman and Michael Jones version

Track listings
 7" single
 "Je te donne" — 4:25
 "Confidentiel" by Jean-Jacques Goldman — 2:36

Charts

Worlds Apart version
In 1996, the multi-national boy band World Apart released a successful cover reaching number 3 in France. It was also a charting hit in Germany, Austria, Belgium, Switzerland and Sweden.

Track listings
 CD single
 "Je te donne" (radio version) — 3:43
 "Let the Sun Shine Down on You" — 3:47

 CD maxi
 "Je te donne" (radio version) — 3:43
 "Let the Sun Shine Down on You" — 3:47
 "Je te donne" (solid noise Montreal mix) — 8:05
 "Je te donne" (organic technology Belgium mix) — 5:00

Charts

End of year charts

Leslie and Ivyrise version

French Leslie and British Ivyrise collaborated on a new joint version on the 2012 tribute album Génération Goldman album. The track was produced by Trak Invaders and was released on My Major Company label.

Ben Falinski, the vocalist from Ivyrise who performed mainly on the track says in the promotional video teaser that the song was his most favourite from Jean-Jacques Goldman and was so happy to have the chance to do it.

Charts

References

1985 singles
1986 singles
1996 singles
Jean-Jacques Goldman songs
Michael Jones (Welsh-French musician) songs
Franglais songs
SNEP Top Singles number-one singles
Male vocal duets
Worlds Apart (band) songs
Songs written by Jean-Jacques Goldman
1985 songs